Elachista griseola is a moth in the family Elachistidae. It was described by Alexey Diakonoff in 1955. It is found in New Guinea.

References

Moths described in 1955
griseola
Moths of Asia